The Brotherhood of Baptist Churches is a Baptist fellowship that includes most Baptists not belonging to the Union of Baptist Churches in the Netherlands.

The Brotherhood was formed in 1981 under the leadership of Henk G. Koekkoek. In 1995 the Brotherhood had about 2500 members in 26 churches.

See also
 Union of Baptist Churches in the Netherlands

Christian organizations established in 1981
Baptist denominations in Europe
Baptist denominations established in the 20th century
Protestantism in the Netherlands
Christian denominations in the Netherlands

de:Baptisten in den Niederlanden